Emmanuel Fréchette is a Canadian film production designer. He is a two-time winner of the Canadian Screen Award for Best Art Direction or Production Design, at the 1st Canadian Screen Awards in 2013 for War Witch (Rebelle) and at the 5th Canadian Screen Awards in 2017 for Two Lovers and a Bear.

His other credits have included the films Savage Messiah, Father and Guns (De père en flic), Route 132, Monsieur Lazhar, Whitewash, Gabrielle, Every Thing Will Be Fine and Endorphine.

References

External links

Canadian production designers
Best Art Direction/Production Design Genie and Canadian Screen Award winners
French Quebecers
Living people
Year of birth missing (living people)